Roissy-en-France (literally Roissy in France; colloquially simply called Roissy) is a commune in the northeastern suburbs of Paris, France, in the Val-d'Oise department. In 2017, it had a population of 2,883.

One-quarter of Charles de Gaulle Airport (France's main airport) but none of its terminals is located in the commune of Roissy-en-France, which gave its original name to the airport. Later renamed, the airport is still commonly referred to as Roissy Airport in France. The rest of the airport lies on the territory of the commune of Tremblay-en-France and several other communes.

Name
In the name Roissy-en-France, 'France' refers not to the country of France but to an area (pays) of the historical province of Île-de-France. Île-de-France was made up of several pays, most notably Pays de France and Hurepoix. Pays de France was the fertile plain located immediately north of the City of Paris, with the city of Saint-Denis at its centre. Pays de France is now almost entirely built up and is covered by the northern suburbs of Paris. Pays de France is also known as "Parisis" and as the plaine de France ("plain of France"), and its name still appears in the name of some communes in the northern suburbs of Paris, such as Roissy-en-France (which literally means "Roissy in the Pays de France").

Transport
Roissy-en-France is not served by Paris Métro, RER, or suburban rail network. The closest station to Roissy-en-France is Aéroport Charles de Gaulle 1 station on line B of the RER, Paris Region's express suburban rail system. This station is located inside the airport, on the part of the airport belonging to the commune of Tremblay-en-France,  from the town center of Roissy-en-France.

Economy
Blue Line, a charter passenger airline, has its head office in Building B of Paris Nord 2, Parc des Lumières in Roissy-en-France.

Air France's head office is located in the Roissypôle complex on the grounds of Charles de Gaulle Airport and in Tremblay-en-France, near Roissy-en-France.

Education
The community has two schools, école maternelle Saint-Exupéry (preschool) and école élémentaire Jean Mermoz.

Literary reference
Roissy is the location where the action of the two explicit sadomasochistic novels Story of O (Histoire d'O), and its sequel Retour à Roissy by Pauline Réage take place.

Climate

Roissy-en-France has a oceanic climate (Köppen climate classification Cfb).

See also

Communes of the Val-d'Oise department

References

External links

Official website 

Association of Mayors of the Val d'Oise 

Communes of Val-d'Oise
Val-d'Oise communes articles needing translation from French Wikipedia